Sir George Hare Philipson, M.D., F.R.C.P. (18 May 1836 – 24 January 1918) was an English physician knighted in 1900.

He was educated at University College, London and Caius College, Cambridge. From 1876 until his death in 1918 he was professor of Medicine at Durham University. He was elected the President of the British Medical Association for the year 1893.

References

External links

20th-century English medical doctors
1836 births
1918 deaths
19th-century English people
20th-century British people
Alumni of Gonville and Caius College, Cambridge
People educated at Marlborough College
People from Newcastle upon Tyne
Vice-Chancellors and Wardens of Durham University
Presidents of the British Medical Association